Ash Walker is a London-based musician, multi-instrumentalist and DJ, whose music spans a diverse range of genres, such as jazz, blues, soul, funk, reggae, dub, trip hop, acid jazz, and electronica, among others. He has released three studio albums: Augmented 7th (2015) and Echo Chamber (2017) on Deep Heads, and Aquamarine (2019) on Night Time Stories.

Career
Ash Walker began his career in 2015 with the release of his debut album, Augmented 7th. The album featured a diverse range of genres, such as dub, reggae, jazz, trip-hop, and electronica. It featured Nikolaj Torp Larsen of The Specials on melodica.

Aquamarine was the first album Walker recorded at home; he recorded his previous albums in recording studios. The album featured Marc Cyril on bass, Yazz Ahmed on trumpet and flugelhorn, Lord Laville on vocals, and Jonathan Shorten on Rhodes piano and Moog synthesizer. The album included vinyl pops and hisses, as a part of what Walker calls an "anti-sound engineer" approach. His engineering approach was influenced by King Tubby.

He formed his live trio in 2017 with himself on keyboards and melodica, Marc Cyril on bass and Tim Shackman on drums. Later, he added Lord Laville on vocals and Yazz Ahmed on trumpet, and named the band The Ash Walker Experience.

As a DJ, Walker has opened for The Specials, Lee "Scratch" Perry, David Rodigan, El-B, and Zed Bias, among others.

His music has gained attention and has been played by renowned radio DJs such as Gilles Peterson, Don Letts, Gideon Coe, Tom Robinson, and Tom Ravenscroft.

Songwriting and influences
Being a bassist himself, Ash Walker writes his songs on bass guitar first.

His influences include Duke Ellington, Quincy Jones, King Tubby, Bo Diddley, 4hero, J Dilla, Pete Rock, Curtis Mayfield, Philip Glass, and Steve Reich, among others.

Discography

Studio albums
 Augmented 7th (2015)
 Echo Chamber (2017)
 Aquamarine (2019)

References

External links
 
 Artist profile at Night Time Stories

Living people
English audio engineers
English bass guitarists
English DJs
English jazz musicians
Acid jazz musicians
English record producers
English reggae musicians
English soul musicians
Black British musicians
Musicians from London
Year of birth missing (living people)
Night Time Stories artists